Pig tail (and variants) may refer to:

Hair dressing
Pigtail, tightly braided hair, usually in one or two braids
Bunches, another hair style sometimes called pigtails
Queue (hairstyle), sometimes called “pigtails”

Animals
Pig tail (also referred to as pork tail), the tail of a domestic pig used as food
Northern pig-tailed macaque
Pig-tailed langur
Southern pig-tailed macaque
Pig-tailed macaque

Other
Pig tail stent, a type of ureteric stent
Buta no shippo, a game
Pig-tail Hex/Jinx, a spell in the Harry Potter universe
Pig Tail Connector, a kind of electrical connector
PIG Tail (Phosphatidylinositol glycan), a membrane anchor for proteins; more commonly called GPI anchor

See also
pig (disambiguation)
Pig (disambiguation)

Animal common name disambiguation pages